Joshilyn Jackson is an American author born February 27, 1968, in Fort Walton Beach, Florida. She was graduated from Booker T. Washington High School in Pensacola, Florida, in 1986. She attended several colleges before getting a two-year degree from Georgia Perimeter College and a BA in English literature from Georgia State University. She received an MA in creative writing from the University of Illinois at Chicago in 1997. She has written eight novels, which in order of publication date are: A Grown-Up Kind of Pretty; Backseat Saints;  The Girl Who Stopped Swimming; Between, Georgia; Gods in Alabama; Someone Else's Love Story; The Opposite of Everyone; The Almost Sisters; and Never Have I Ever. She has also written the novella My Own Miraculous. Jackson describes her writing style as "Weirdo Fiction with a Shot of Southern Gothic Influence for Smart People Who Can Catch the Nuances but Who Like Narrative Drive, and Who Have a Sense of Humor but Who Are Willing to Go Down to Dark Places"

Jackson is a member of the board of Reforming Arts, a nonprofit which provides liberal arts classes to women in Georgia prisons. She herself teaches creative writing classes inside Lee Arrendale State Prison.

References

21st-century American novelists
American women novelists
Living people
Novelists from Georgia (U.S. state)
Year of birth missing (living people)
21st-century American women writers